Las Campanas is a golf course community and census-designated place (CDP) in Santa Fe County, New Mexico, United States. It was first listed as a CDP prior to the 2020 census.

The CDP is in northwestern Santa Fe County and is bordered to the north by La Tierra, to the east by Tano Road, and to the south by Tres Arroyos. The Club at Las Campanas, a country club, is at the center of the community.

Demographics

References 

Census-designated places in Santa Fe County, New Mexico
Census-designated places in New Mexico